Senechal or Sénéchal may refer to:

People
 Florian Sénéchal, French racing cyclist
 Marjorie Senechal (née Wikler), American mathematician and historian of science
 Michel Sénéchal, French tenor
 Robert Sénéchal, French industrialist/motor manufacturer, racing driver and pilot
 Sean Senechal, American futurist
 Le Sénéchal de Kerkado, French composer

Other uses
 Sénéchal (automobile)

See also
 Seneschal